Cyrtodactylus jaintiaensis is a species of gecko endemic to India.

References

Cyrtodactylus
Reptiles described in 2018
Reptiles of India
Endemic fauna of India